The Member of Parliament for Ipswich in Suffolk, Richard Stokes, of the Labour Party died on 3 August 1957.

The by-election to fill his seat was held on 24 October.

References

External links
British Parliamentary By Elections:  Campaign literature from the by-election

See also
Lists of United Kingdom by-elections

1957
History of Ipswich
Ipswich by-election
Ipswich by-election
Ipswich by-election
Ipswich